Thunderbird is the name of the northernmost wooden roller coaster in the world, located at PowerPark in Alahärmä, Western Finland. The two Millennium Flyer trains operating it were manufactured by Great Coasters International (GCI). It is the basis for American Thunder at Six Flags St. Louis

Thunderbird was the first wooden roller coaster in Europe to be built by GCI.  Approximately 1,000 cubic metres of wood, 750,000 bolts and 1.8 million nails were used for Thunderbird's construction.  President of GCI, Clair Hain, Jr., commended the Finnish carpenters for their remarkable chainsaw skills.  The track is almost one kilometer in length and reaches a speed of about 75 km/h.

Awards

References

External links
guenter-engelhardt.de
Thunderbird

Roller coasters in Finland
Roller coasters introduced in 2006
Kauhava